Fortuna POP! was an English independent record label based in London, started in 1995 by Sean Price. It specialised in indie pop music.

Fortuna POP! previously promoted gigs under the banner of The Beat Hotel and then Basement Scam at the Buffalo Bar in Highbury, London and then promoted events under their own name. The label has been called an "indie institution".

On 31 July 2016, initially via a full page statement in the programme of that summer's Indietracks festival, the label announced that it was to be shut down.

The label was home to both previously established underground acts, such as Darren Hayman, the Wave Pictures and Comet Gain, and breakthrough bands such as the Pains of Being Pure at Heart, Evans the Death and the Spook School.

Artists on Fortuna POP!
Airport Girl
The Aislers Set
Allo Darlin'
Bearsuit
The Butterflies of Love
Cannonball Jane
The Chemistry Experiment
Chorusgirl
Comet Gain
Crystal Stilts
Discordia
Evans The Death 
Fanfarlo
Finlay
The Grave Architects
Darren Hayman
Joanna Gruesome
Let's Wrestle
Simon Love
The Loves
The Lucksmiths
Mammoth Penguins
Martha
Milky Wimpshake
The Pains of Being Pure at Heart
The Pipettes
The Primitives
The Spook School
September Girls
Shrag
Sodastream
Steven James Adams
Tender Trap
Tigercats
Tullycraft
Withered Hand
Would-Be-Goods

References

External links
Fortuna POP! website
Penny Black interview
God Is In The TV interview
Line of Best Fit interview
Artrocker interview 
Clash profile

British independent record labels
Alternative rock record labels
Indie rock record labels
Record labels established in 1995
Indie pop record labels